Mongolomintho is a genus of bristle flies in the family Tachinidae. There is one described species in Mongolomintho, M. longipes.

References

Further reading

 
 
 

Tachinidae
Monotypic Brachycera genera